Saint Sigismunt Church in Szydlowiec is a church that was built towards the close of the Gothic period (the church constitutive act dated January 1, 1401) and is an example of the Late Gothic hall church. The exterior is of local sandstone. The late-Gothic silhouette of the church does not prepare a visitor for the impression made by its Renaissance interior colorful polychromy.

In the chancel there is a most beautiful late-Gothic polyptych showing the Assumption and Evangelical scenes made in 1509 in a workshop in Kraków. The 19th-century church organ of the beautiful and rich tone are used also for secular purposes within the framework.

15th-century Roman Catholic church buildings in Poland
Szydłowiec
Szydlowiec
Roman Catholic churches completed in 1401